Ruud Kool (born 1 November 1966) is a retired Dutch footballer who played as a midfielder for AZ Alkmaar, FC Twente, Fortuna Sittard and VVV Venlo.

External links
 

1966 births
Living people
Dutch footballers
AZ Alkmaar players
Fortuna Sittard players
FC Twente players
VVV-Venlo players
People from Noorder-Koggenland
Association football midfielders
Sportspeople from North Holland